Maru Piravi is a 1973 Indian Tamil-language erotic thriller film directed by T. R. Ramanna. It stars R. Muthuraman and Manjula. It is the Tamil remake of the 1971 Malayalam film Punarjanmam. The film was released on 9 February 1973.

Plot

Cast 
 R. Muthuraman as Elango
 Manjula as Saratha
 S. A. Ashokan
 Vijayasree
Sukumari
 Nagesh
 Thengai Srinivasan
M. R. R. Vasu
Manorama
 Lalitha

Soundtrack 
Music was by T. R. Pappa and lyrics were written by Kannadasan.

References

External links 
 

1970s erotic thriller films
1970s Tamil-language films
1972 films
Films scored by T. R. Pappa
Indian erotic thriller films
Tamil remakes of Malayalam films